Raymond Castilloux (born November 23, 1934) is former racing cyclist, who was born in Canada. At age 14, he went to spend the summer in Buffalo, New York, while visiting his relatives. He eventually started school there and worked as steel-worker in the open-hearth.

At age 18, he was interested in ice speed skating and in the summer he took up cycling. He participated in different races, and became a professional cyclist. He became a US citizen and became the No. 1 cyclist in the 1964 classification for the Olympics of 1964 in Central Park, New York. He then represented the United States in the individual road race at the 1964 Summer Olympics in Tokyo. Ray also represented the United States in Mexico.

References

1934 births
Living people
Canadian male cyclists
American male cyclists
Cyclists at the 1964 Summer Olympics
Olympic cyclists of the United States
Sportspeople from Quebec